Charles Audran (1594–1674) was a French engraver.

Life
Charles Audran was the first of the Audran family who became eminent in the art of engraving. He was born in Paris in 1594. In his boyhood he showed a great disposition for the art. He received some instruction in drawing, and when still young went to Rome to complete his studies. There he produced some plates that were admired. He adopted that species of engraving that is entirely performed with the graver, and seems to have modeled  his style on that   of Cornelis Bloemaert.

On his return to France he lived for some time in Lyons, but finally settled in Paris, where he died in 1674, aged 80. He marked his prints, which are very numerous, in the early part of his life with a "C-", until his brother Claude, who also engraved a few plates, marked them with the same letter; he then changed it for K., as the initial of Karl. The following are his principal prints :

Portraits
Henri of Condé, with the Four Cardinal Virtues; K. Audran, sc.; oval.
Andre Laurent, physician to Henry IV; oval.
Pierre Séguier; oval, with ornaments; after Chauveau.
An allegorical subject, of two Portraits, with a Genius painting a third Portrait; inscribed on the pallet, unus ex duobus; signed C. Audran, fecit.

Subjects after different masters
The title for the Gallery of the Great Women, representing Anne of Austria and nineteen other eminent women, with a subject from their life in the background; after Pietro da Cortona.
The Annunciation; inscribed Spiritus Sanctus, fe.; after Lodovico Carracci, incorrectly attributed on the plate to Annibale; very fine; it is the picture in the Cathedral at Bologna.
The Baptism of Christ; small oval; after Ann. Carracci; unsigned.
St. Francis de Paula; after Mellin; marked Carl. Audran, so.
The Stoning of Stephen; after Palma 'the younger'.
The Conception of the Virgin Mary; after Stella.
The Nativity; after the same.
The Holy Family, with St. Catharine and Angels; after the same; fine.
The Virgin and Infant Jesus, St. John presenting an Apple, and St. Catharine kneeling; after Titian.
The Virgin Mary and Infant Jesus treading on the Serpent; after G. L. Valesio.
A Thesis, representing Religion as the true Knowledge; inscribed Non judiciamus, etc.; after C. Vignon.
St. Francis de Paula in ecstasy before the Sacrament; after S. Vouet.
Frontispiece for a Book, Fame holding the Portrait of Cardinal Mazarin; after the same.
The Assumption of the Virgin; after Domenichino.

Meyer's ' Künstler-Lexikon' lists  223 of his works.

References
 

1594 births
1674 deaths
17th-century French engravers
Engravers from Paris